Mary Karlino Madut is a South Sudanese politician. She has served as Minister of Parliamentary Affairs of Western Bahr el Ghazal since 18 May 2010.

References

Living people
South Sudanese women in politics
21st-century South Sudanese women politicians
21st-century South Sudanese politicians
People from Western Bahr el Ghazal
Year of birth missing (living people)
Place of birth missing (living people)